Diadegma boreale is a wasp first described by Horstmann in 1980. No subspecies are listed.

References

boreale
Insects described in 1980